The West Riding Limited is a named passenger train operating in the United Kingdom.

History

The West Riding Limited was introduced by the London and North Eastern Railway in 1937 to operate between London King's Cross and Leeds and Bradford. The company built a new set of carriages, identical to the Coronation sets of 1935 which comprised four twin articulated coaches with two kitchen cars in each train set. There were seats for 48 first class and 168 third class passengers. The service started on 27 September 1937 when the first train was hauled by LNER Class A4 Dominion of New Zealand which had only entered service three months earlier.

The train was stored for the duration of the Second World War and service resumed in 1949.

The name has been retained by London North Eastern Railway and in 2017 is operated as the 06:30 departure from Bradford Forster Square, arriving at London King's Cross at 08:59.

References

Named passenger trains of the London and North Eastern Railway
Railway services introduced in 1937
1937 establishments in England